Columbia Park is a public park in Seattle, in the U.S. state of Washington. Annexed to the city in 1907, the park is adjacent to the Columbia Branch of the Seattle Public Library.

References

External links
 

Parks in Seattle